Ethel Charlotte Pedley (19 June 1859 – 6 August 1898) was an English-Australian author and musician.

Early life
Ethel Charlotte Pedley was born on 19 June 1859 at Acton, near London.  She was the daughter of Frederick Pedley and his wife Eliza, née Dolby. Pedley began piano lessons aged 5. Pedley migrated to Australia with her family in the 1870s but returned to London to study at the Royal Academy of Music, where she studied with her uncle Prosper Sainton, professor of violin, and won a medal. She was also trained by her aunt, the famous contralto Charlotte Sainton-Dolby, at her Vocal Academy.

Career

Musician and music teacher
Pedley returned to Sydney in 1882, and began teaching singing and the violin.  In 1896 Emmeline Woolley and Pedley visited London and persuaded the Associated Board of the Royal Academy of Music and the Royal College of Music to extend their examinations to the Australian colonies. Pedley was appointed the solo representative of the Royal Academy of Music for New South Wales. The first examiner visited in 1897.

Author

Pedley's only published book is Dot and the Kangaroo, which featured a little girl named Dot who becomes lost in the Australian outback, and is helped to find her way back home by a friendly kangaroo. The illustrations were drawn by Frank P. Mahony.

Pedley was a believer in the conservation of the Australian flora and fauna, and usually wrote from this perspective, singling out 'man' as disconnected from nature and the rest of the animals. It is thought her writing was inspired by her visits to the property owned by her brother Arthur, near Walgett.

Ethel's preface to Dot and the Kangaroo is as follows:

To the children of Australia
in the hope of enlisting their sympathies
for the many beautiful, amiable, and frolicsome creatures
of their fair land,
whose extinction, through ruthless destruction,
is being surely accomplished

Illness and death
Stricken with cancer, Pedley died on 6 August 1898 at the Darlinghurst home of her companion Emmeline Woolley at the age of 39.  Her only novel, Dot and the Kangaroo would be published posthumously the following year.  Pedley was buried in the Anglican section of Waverley Cemetery. Following her death, her brother established the Ethel Pedley memorial travelling scholarship for music students.

Works

References

External links

 
 
 
 Obituary in The Sydney Morning Herald 8 August 1898. Retrieved 6 June 2014.
 Ethel Pedley at IMDb

1859 births
1898 deaths
19th-century Australian women writers
19th-century Australian writers
Australian children's writers
Australian conservationists
Australian nature writers
Australian women children's writers
Women naturalists
English emigrants to Australia
British music educators
Australian music educators